PMMA may refer to: 

 para-Methoxymethamphetamine, a stimulant drug
 Philippine Merchant Marine Academy
 Poly(methyl methacrylate), a transparent thermoplastic often used as a glass substitute